Solanum lasiocarpum, synonym Solanum ferox L., otherwise known as Indian nightshade or hairy-fruited eggplant, is a plant that produces edible fruit. Its flowers are white and its fruits are pale yellow.

S. lasiocarpum is found wild in parts of temperate and tropical Asia: the Andaman Islands, Sri Lanka, Indochina, south China, Taiwan, much of Malesia, Papuasia and Queensland, Australia. In other countries it is primarily known as a domesticated plant. Domesticated plants bear larger fruits and lack the prickly skin that is found in the wild plants. The color found in the center of fruit is light green, like that of Solanum quitoense.  It's cultivated in tropical Asia, used in food additives for flavoring, and given to the sick as a folk medicine. In India, the locals use the fruit as a sour-relish in curries. In Thailand, a special kind of sauce called nam prek is made with the fruit.

Solanum lasiocarpum is of interest to botanists because of its strong resemblance to, and apparent close relation to South American species, the cocona (S. sessiliflorum), the naranjilla (S. quitoense), and the pseudolulo (S. pseudolulo) in particular.  When grown outside of their native range, all four of those plants will readily hybridize, producing sterile offspring.  This has some potential to enhance the commercial viability of each of those species elsewhere in the world.

References

External links
 Solanum lasiocarpum on Solanaceae Source

lasiocarpum
Edible Solanaceae
Flora of the Andaman Islands
Flora of China
Flora of Indo-China
Flora of Malesia
Flora of Papuasia
Flora of Queensland
Flora of Sri Lanka
Flora of Taiwan